Our Man from Jersey is an upcoming American action thriller film starring Mark Wahlberg and Halle Berry.

Premise
A construction worker is roped into the espionage world by his former high school girlfriend.

Cast
 Mark Wahlberg as Mike
 Halle Berry as Roxanne
 J. K. Simmons
 Jackie Earle Haley
 Adewale Akinnuoye-Agbaje
 Jessica De Gouw
 Alice Lee

Production
It was announced in May 2020 that Netflix had purchased the pitch for the film, which would see Mark Wahlberg star. Joe Barton and David Guggenheim will write the screenplay from a story by Stephen Levinson. In March 2021, Halle Berry was cast to co-star alongside Wahlberg. In May 2022, J. K. Simmons, Jackie Earle Haley, Adewale Akinnuoye-Agbaje, Jessica De Gouw and Alice Lee were added to the cast.

Filming had commenced in March 2022, with shooting to take place in London, New Jersey, and Piran. The production caused slight controversy in May 2022 due to air and noise pollution from filming in Fitzrovia. In September 2022, filming occurred in Ponterosso Trieste, Italy.

References

External links
 

American spy films
American thriller films
Films shot in London
Films shot in New Jersey
Upcoming films
Upcoming Netflix original films
Films directed by Julian Farino